Polystichum is a genus of ferns in the family Dryopteridaceae, subfamily Dryopteridoideae, according to the Pteridophyte Phylogeny Group classification of 2016 (PPG I). The genus has about 500 species and has a cosmopolitan distribution. The highest diversity is in eastern Asia, with about 208 species in China alone; the region from Mexico to Brazil has at least 100 additional species; Africa (at least 17 species), North America (at least 18 species), and Europe (at least 5 species) have much lower diversity. Polystichum species are terrestrial or rock-dwelling ferns of warm-temperate and montane-tropical regions (a few species grow in alpine regions). They are often found in disturbed habitats such as road cuts, talus slopes, and stream banks.

Description
The sori are round, with a circular indusium, except in South American species which lack an indusium. The stipes have prominent scales with often have hair-like cilia, but lack any true hairs. The genus differs from the well-known and allied fern genus Dryopteris in the indusium being circular, not reniform, and in having the leaf segments with auricles—asymmetrical blades where one side of the segment is much longer than the other at the base.

Apomixis
Apomixis, the development of an embryo without the occurrence of fertilization, is particularly common among ferns. Apomixis evolved several times independently in three different clades of polystichoid ferns.

Taxonomy 
Polystichum is one of the 10 largest fern genera and is grouped within the Dryopteridaceae. Polystichum s.l. is well defined as its own monophyletic group, including species from the genera Cyrtomidictyum, Cyrtogonellum, Cyrtomium, and Phanerophlebia. Research concerning taxonomy within Polystichum s.s. is ongoing, with high levels of hybridization, allopolyploidy, and apomixis making distinctions difficult. Based on genetic analysis Little & Barrington (2003) originally defined a monophyletic Polystichum s.s. by removing Cyrtomium as its own genus. It was further separated by Li et al. (2008) into a separate clade along with Phanerophlebia.

Selected species
The genus has a large number of species. The genus Polystichum includes, but is not limited to, the following species. In this list, a species name preceded by (=) is considered to be a synonym of the accepted species name above it.

 – Christmas fern
 – Hard shield fern

(=) 

 – Aleutian shield fern
 – Anderson's hollyfern
Polystichum atkinsonii 
Polystichum australiense 
Polystichum bakerianum 
Polystichum biaristatum 
Polystichum bomiense 
Polystichum bonapartii 
Polystichum bonseyi  – Bonsey's Hollyfern
Polystichum brachypterum  – Rusty swordfern
Polystichum braunii  – Braun's shield fern, Braun's hollyfern
Polystichum brachypterum (=) Polystichum garhwalicum 
Polystichum bulbiferum 
Polystichum calderonense  – Monte Guilarte hollyfern
Polystichum californicum  – California sword fern
Polystichum capillipes (=) Polystichum michelii (=) Polystichum minusculum (=) Polystichum molliculum 
Polystichum castaneum 
Polystichum chilense 
Polystichum christii 
Polystichum chunii 
Polystichum craspedosorum 
Polystichum cyclolobum 
Polystichum cystostegia  – Alpine shield fern
Polystichum deltodon 
Polystichum dielsii 
Polystichum discretum 
Polystichum drepanum 
Polystichum dudleyi  – Dudley's sword fern
Polystichum duthiei (=) Polystichum tsuchuense 
Polystichum echinatum  – Rusty swordfern
Polystichum erosum 
Polystichum excellens 
Polystichum eximium (=) Polystichum tialooshanense 
Polystichum falcatipinnum 
Polystichum falcinellum 
Polystichum fallax 
Polystichum formosanum 
Polystichum glandulosum 
Polystichum gongboense (=) Polystichum rarum 
Polystichum grandifrons (=) Polystichum kiusiuense 
Polystichum gymnocarpium 
Polystichum haleakalense  – Island swordfern
Polystichum hancockii 
Polystichum hecatopteron 
Polystichum herbaceum 
Polystichum imbricans  – Narrowleaf sword fern
Polystichum incongruum 
Polystichum kruckebergii  – Kruckeberg's sword fern/holly fern
Polystichum kwakiutlii 
Polystichum lachenense 
Polystichum lanceolatum 
Polystichum lemmonii  – Lemmon's holly fern, Shasta fern
Polystichum lentum 
Polystichum lonchitis  – Holly fern
Polystichum longidens 
Polystichum longipaleatum 
Polystichum longipes 
Polystichum luctuosum  – Mourning shield fern
Polystichum macleae 
Polystichum macrochlaenum 
Polystichum makinoi 
Polystichum martini 
Polystichum mayebarae 
Polystichum mediocre 
Polystichum medogense 
Polystichum microchlamys 
Polystichum mohrioides 
Polystichum mollissimum 
Polystichum monticola  – Mountain shield fern
Polystichum moorei 
Polystichum morii 
Polystichum moupinense (=) Polystichum woodsioides 
Polystichum munitum  – Western sword fern(=) Polystichum solitarium 
Polystichum muricatum (=) Polystichum moritzianum 
Polystichum nakenense  
Polystichum neolobatum (=) Polystichum assurgens (=) Polystichum yigongense 
Polystichum nepalense (=) Polystichum atroviridissimum 
Polystichum ningshenense 
Polystichum obliquum 
Polystichum omeiense (=) Polystichum carvifolium 
Polystichum ordinatum (=) Polystichum bicolor 
Polystichum orientalitibeticum 
Polystichum paramoupinense 
Polystichum parvipinnulum 
Polystichum piceopaleaceum 
Polystichum polyblepharum  – Tassel fern(=) Polystichum aculeatum var. japonicum (=) Polystichum setosum 
Polystichum prescottianum (=) Polystichum erinaceum 
Polystichum prionolepis (=) Polystichum rectipinnum 
Polystichum proliferum – Mother shield fern
Polystichum pseudocastaneum (=) Polystichum brunneum 
Polystichum pseudomakinoi 
Polystichum punctiferum (=) Polystichum glingense (=) Polystichum virescens 
Polystichum pungens  – Forest shield fern(=) Polystichum lucidum 
Polystichum qamdoense (=) Polystichum tumbatzense 
Polystichum retrosopaleaceum (=) Polystichum aculeatum var. retrosopaleaceum 
Polystichum rhombiforme 
Polystichum rhomboidea (=) Polystichum rhomboideum 
Polystichum richardii  – Common shield fern
Polystichum rigens (=) Polystichum platychlamys 
Polystichum rotundilobum 
Polystichum scopulinum  – Mountain holly fern, rock sword fern(=) Polystichum mohrioides var. scopulinum 
Polystichum semifertile (=) Polystichum nyalamense 
Polystichum setiferum  – Soft shield fern(=) Polystichum angulare 
Polystichum setigerum  – Alaska hollyfern
Polystichum shensiense (=) Polystichum lichiangense 
Polystichum silvaticum 
Polystichum simplicipinnum 
Polystichum sinense (=) Polystichum atuntzeense (=) Polystichum austrotibeticum (=) Polystichum decorum (=) Polystichum ellipticum (=) Polystichum fukuyamae (=) Polystichum lhasaense (=) Polystichum parasinense (=) Polystichum wilsoni 
Polystichum squarrosum (=) Polystichum apicisterile (=) Polystichum integripinnulum 
Polystichum stenophyllum var. conaense (=) Polystichum conaense 
Polystichum stimulans (=) Polystichum ilicifolium 
Polystichum submite (=) Polystichum paradoxum 
Polystichum tacticopterum (=) Polystichum heteropaleaceum (=) Polystichum kodamae 
Polystichum thomsoni 
Polystichum tibeticum 
Polystichum transvaalense  – Stemmed shield fern 
Polystichum tripteron 
Polystichum tsus-simense  – Korean rock fern(=) Polystichum falcilobum 
Polystichum vestitum  – Prickly shield fern
Polystichum wattii 
Polystichum whiteleggei 
Polystichum xiphophyllum (=) Polystichum monotis (=) Polystichum praelongum 
Polystichum yadongense 
Polystichum yunnanense (=) Polystichum gyirongense (=) Polystichum jizhushanense

Hybrids
Hybridisation is frequent in the genus, with several named hybrids, including:-

P. × bicknellii (P. aculeatum × P. setiferum)
P. × illyricum (P. aculeatum × P. lonchitis)
P. × lonchitiforme (P. lonchitis × P. setiferum)
P. × lesliei (P. setiferum × P. munitum) first found in Surrey in 1995 and a second plant found in Cornwall in 2001.

Former species
Species that were at one time considered part of the genus Polystichum, but are now categorized elsewhere, include:
Polystichum auriculatum  = Dryopteris auriculata 
Polystichum falcatum  = Cyrtomium falcatum  – Japanese Holly Fern
Polystichum lepidocaulon  = Cyrtomidictyum lepidocaulon

Distribution 
With species in six continents and many islands, Polystichum is remarkable for its global spread. Polystichum ferns first emerged in Asia during the late Eocene, around 49 million years ago. During this period there were high temperatures across the globe, which may have contributed to the diversification of flora.

Polystichum's spread to the New World took place during the late Eocene to early Oligocene. The most likely dispersal method was across a paratropical forest on a Pacific Ocean land bridge, such as the Bering Land Bridge. For a period before the height of the Ice Age temperatures froze enough seawater to lower the sea level but still allowed a forest to grow in Northern latitudes. From there Polystichum was able to spread through North American and into Central America.

Original theories described Polystichum spreading further into South America from Central America, but recent research has shown that South American Polystichum instead spread through long-distance dispersal from Australia. Genetic study has revealed close evolutionary relationships between Polystichum species in these two areas. Both Austral and Austral South American species lack and indusium. Austral Polystichum lack cilia, while South American species have marginal cilia.

Hawaiian Polystichum also spread through long-distance dispersal, with two separate dispersal events leading to the three Polystichum now observed in Hawaii.

Ecology
Polystichum species are used as food plants by the larvae of some Lepidoptera species including Pharmacis fusconebulosa. Specimens of some of these can be found at the Royal Botanic Gardens, Sydney.

Cultivation
Several species are grown as ornamental plants in gardens, notably P. setiferum. One species, P. tsus-simense of eastern Asia, is commonly offered as a houseplant.

References

External links

 
Jepson Manual Treatment
the Polystichum homepage

 
Dryopteridaceae
Fern genera
Garden plants